Cytinus sanguineus is a species of parasitic plant in the family Cytinaceae.

References

Cytinaceae
Plants described in 1932